The 1989–90 season was Real Madrid Club de Fútbol's 88th season in existence and the club's 59th consecutive season in the top flight of Spanish football.

Season
Real Madrid finished the campaign as league champions for the fifth season running, claiming their 25th league title overall. Furthermore, under the helm of new coach John Benjamin Toshack, the team broke the record for most league goals in a season, with 107. Mexican striker Hugo Sánchez scored 38 of them, equaling Telmo Zarra's record, and won the European Golden Boot. Real Madrid were also aiming to clinch the second consecutive domestic double, going all the way to the Copa del Rey final where they were beaten by Barcelona 0–2.

Squad

Transfers

In

 from CD Logroñés
 from Real Valladolid
 from UD Las Palmas
 from Atlético Madrid

Out

 to Real Madrid Castilla
 to Udinese
 to CD Logroñés

Competitions

La Liga

Results by round

League table

Matches

Copa del Rey

Round of 16

Quarter-finals

Semi-finals

Final

European Cup

First round

Round of 16

Supercopa

Awarded automatically to Real Madrid after they won the Double (League and Copa del Rey).

Friendlies

American Trip

Statistics

Squad statistics

Players statistics

See also
La Quinta del Buitre

References

Real Madrid CF seasons
Real Madrid CF
Spanish football championship-winning seasons